Qasemabad-e Sofla may refer to:
 Qasemabad-e Sofla, Fars
 Qasemabad-e Sofla, Gilan
 Qasemabad-e Sofla, Markazi